Pratapnagar Legislative Assembly constituency is one of the 70 assembly constituencies of  Uttarakhand a northern state of India. Pratapnagar is part of Tehri Garhwal Lok Sabha constituency. Pratapnagar tehsil is included in this constituency.

Members of Legislative Assembly

Election results

2022

See also
 Tehri Garhwal (Lok Sabha constituency)

References

External links
  
 
 RESULTS 2012 Uttarakhand State
 Purola (Uttarakhand) Elections 2022 Results

Tehri Garhwal district
Assembly constituencies of Uttarakhand
2002 establishments in Uttarakhand
Constituencies established in 2002